The 2005 Tampa Bay Devil Rays season was the team's eighth since the franchise was created. This season, they finished last in the AL East division, and managed to finish the season with the AL's third-worst record of 67–95. Their manager was Lou Piniella who entered his third and last season with the Devil Rays.

Offseason 
October 15, 2004: Midre Cummings was released by the Tampa Bay Devil Rays.
January 12, 2005: Alex Gonzalez was signed as a free agent with the Tampa Bay Devil Rays.
February 7, 2005: Denny Neagle was signed as a free agent with the Tampa Bay Devil Rays.
 April 4, 2005: Charles Johnson was signed as a free agent by the Devil Rays.

Regular season

Season standings

Record vs. opponents

Notable transactions
 June 13, 2005: Charles Johnson was released by the Devil Rays.

Roster

Player stats

Batting

Starters by position 
Note: Pos = Position; G = Games played; AB = At bats; H = Hits; Avg. = Batting average; HR = Home runs; RBI = Runs batted in

Other batters 
Note: G = Games played; AB = At bats; H = Hits; Avg. = Batting average; HR = Home runs; RBI = Runs batted in

Pitching

Starting pitchers 
Note: G = Games pitched; IP = Innings pitched; W = Wins; L = Losses; ERA = Earned run average; SO = Strikeouts

Other pitchers 
Note: G = Games pitched; IP = Innings pitched; W = Wins; L = Losses; ERA = Earned run average; SO = Strikeouts

Relief pitchers 
Note: G = Games pitched; W = Wins; L = Losses; SV = Saves; ERA = Earned run average; SO = Strikeouts

Farm system

Notes

References 

2005 Tampa Bay Devil Rays at Baseball Reference
2005 Tampa Bay Devil Rays team page at www.baseball-almanac.com

Tampa Bay Devil Rays seasons
Tampa Bay Devil Rays season
Tampa Bay Devil Rays